South Somerset was a single-member (MP) county constituency in Somerset for the House of Commons of the Parliament of the United Kingdom. As all single-member seats, after the 1832 Great Reform, its elections were by first past the post voting.

It was created under the Redistribution of Seats Act 1885 for the general election that year. The Act changed the county's representation to seven county and four borough seats, and abolished for the 1918 general election.

It's elections returned one Liberal, then another, covering its first 26 years; then returned a Conservative for its final seven years.

Boundaries

The Municipal Borough of Yeovil, the Sessional Divisions of Crewkerne and Yeovil, and part of the Sessional Division of Ilminster.

Members of Parliament

Elections

Elections in the 1880s 

Lambart was appointed Vice-Chamberlain of the Household, requiring a by-election.

Elections in the 1890s

Elections in the 1900s

Elections in the 1910s 

General Election 1914–15:

Another General Election was required to take place before the end of 1915. The political parties had been making preparations for an election to take place and by July 1914, the following candidates had been selected; 
Unionist: Aubrey Herbert
Liberal: Henry Harvey Vivian

References 

Parliamentary constituencies in Somerset (historic)
Constituencies of the Parliament of the United Kingdom established in 1885
Constituencies of the Parliament of the United Kingdom disestablished in 1918